The 1978 United States Senate election in New Mexico took place on November 7, 1978. Incumbent Republican U.S. Senator Pete Domenici successfully ran for re-election to a second term, defeating Democrat Toney Anaya.

Republican primary

Candidates 
 Pete Domenici, incumbent U.S. Senator

Democratic primary

Candidates 
 Toney Anaya, Attorney General of New Mexico

General election

Results

See also 
 1978 United States Senate elections

References 

New Mexico
1978
1978 New Mexico elections